Marsyas is a 150-meter-long, ten storey high sculpture designed by Anish Kapoor and Cecil Balmond. It was on show at Tate Modern gallery, London in 2003 and was commissioned as part of the Unilever Series. Marsyas was the third in a series of commissions for Tate Modern’s Turbine Hall and the first to make use of the entire space.

Anish Kapoor is renowned for his sculptural forms that permeate physical and psychological space. Cecil Balmond is a designer, artist, architect, engineer, and writer. He is also the recipient of the RIBA Charles Jencks Award for Theory in Practice.

Marsyas consists of three steel rings joined together by a single span of specially-designed red PVC membrane. The two rings are positioned vertically, at each end of the space, while a third is suspended parallel with the bridge. Wedged into place, the geometry generated by these three rigid steel structures determines the sculpture’s overall form, a shiftform vertical to horizontal and back to vertical again. Using digital form-finding techniques that simulate the forces found in biological forms – i.e. surface tension, uniform and hydrostatic pressure, the design was inspired by multiple parallel and diverging concepts and processes.

The sculpture's title refers to Marsyas, the satyr in Greek mythology, who was flayed alive by the god Apollo.

The Guardian called it “the biggest sculpture at Tate Modern and probably the biggest in any art gallery in the world.” 

Kapoor and Balmond have collaborated on other art projects. They jointly designed Temenos, ‘a gently twisted tube on a vast butterfly net’ which appeared in June, located in the UK’s Teesside. It is the first of five giant sculpture which will form in the biggest public art work in the world.

Balmond and Kapoor have also designed London's ArcelorMittal Orbit which opened for the 2012 Summer Olympics.

In 2003, the composition Lamentate (Homage to Anish Kapoor and his sculpture "Marsyas") for piano and orchestra by Estonian composer Arvo Pärt was premiered in the Tate Modern Turbine Hall.

References

External links
 Engineering Marsyas at Tate Modern
 The Big Issue… by Julian Stallabrass
 

2003 sculptures
Sculptures of the Tate galleries
Sculptures by Anish Kapoor